The Para Sport - Men's 100 metres (T46) at the 2010 Commonwealth Games as part of the athletics programme was held at the Jawaharlal Nehru Stadium on Thursday 7 October 2010.

Round 1
First 3 in each heat (Q) and 4 best performers (q) advance to the Semifinals

Heat 1

Heat 2

Heat 3

Heat 4

Semifinals
First 3 in each heat (Q) and 2 best performers (q) advance to the Final

Semifinal 1

Semifinal 2

Finals

External links
2010 Commonwealth Games - Athletics

Men's 100 metres (T46)